The São João River is a tributary of the Grande River in Minas Gerais state, southeastern Brazil.

See also
 List of rivers of Minas Gerais

References
 Map from Ministry of Transport
 Rand McNally, The New International Atlas, 1993.

Rivers of Minas Gerais